Je'rin, also known as jérin-jérin and Ayo,  is a mancala game which is very similar to Ba-awa. It is played by Yoruba people in Nigeria.

Rules 
The game has the same rules as Ba-awa except the following:
The contents of two adjacent holes (a total of eight seeds) are used for the opening move.
When there are just eight seeds left on the board, the player who captured the first four with the last seed of a lap anywhere on the board takes these and the game ends.

Traditional mancala games